was a Japanese era name after Karyaku and before Genkō. This period spanned the years from August 1329 through April 1331 in the Southern Court, but continued to be used in the Northern Court until 1332.

Change of era
 1329 : The new era name was created to mark an event or series of events. The previous era ended and the new one commenced in Karyaku 4.

Events of the Gentoku era
 March 27, 1330 (Gentoku 2, 8th day of the 3rd month): The Emperor visited Tōdai-ji and Kōfuku-ji in Nara.

Notes

References
 Nussbaum, Louis-Frédéric and Käthe Roth. (2005). Japan encyclopedia. Cambridge: Harvard University Press. ; OCLC 58053128
 Titsingh, Isaac. (1834). Nihon Odai Ichiran; ou, Annales des empereurs du Japon. Paris: Royal Asiatic Society, Oriental Translation Fund of Great Britain and Ireland. OCLC 5850691
 Varley, H. Paul. (1980). A Chronicle of Gods and Sovereigns: Jinnō Shōtōki of Kitabatake Chikafusa. New York: Columbia University Press. ; OCLC 6042764

External links
 National Diet Library, "The Japanese Calendar" -- historical overview plus illustrative images from library's collection

Japanese eras
1320s in Japan
1330s in Japan